Thomas Skinner is an American television and film executive. Skinner has received four Emmy Awards, three Peabody Awards, and a Dupont/Columbia award. He is known for his work in public television as Executive Producer of National Geographic Specials and other programming for PBS and WQED in Pittsburgh, Pennsylvania and the Free to Choose Network.

Education 
Skinner earned a B.S from the State University of New York-Fredonia in Radio, Television and Speech Education and a Masters and Ph.D. degree in Radio, Television, and Theater from the University of Michigan.

Following graduation, Skinner joined the San Diego State faculty as an Assistant Professor, and later Associate Professor, teaching television production.

Career
In association with psychologist Carl Rogers at the Western Behavioral Institute in La Jolla, Skinner directed the documentary film Journey into Self The firm was awarded the Oscar for Best Documentary Feature by the Academy of Motion Picture Arts and Sciences after the original winner, Young Americans, was found to be ineligible.

In 1966, Skinner left San Diego State to become Assistant Manager of the public television station, WITF, in Hershey, Pennsylvania. His work included projects such as Sons and Daughters, A Time to Act, and Interact. He also wrote and produced the documentary Fence Around the Amish featuring Ed Begley. In 1970, WITF General Manager Lloyd Kaiser and Skinner became president and Executive Vice President at the nation's first community-licensed public television station, WQED in Pittsburgh, PA. Skinner was also responsible for the establishment of WQED-FM and Pittsburgh Magazine. Skinner also served as Chief Officer at  WQED-FM and Pittsburgh Magazine.

Skinner was executive producer of National Geographic Specials, Planet Earth and The Infinite Voyage. Skinner was responsible for bringing the National Geographic Specials to PBS and secured funding for the series from Gulf Oil Corporation. Works produced in conjunction with the National Geographic Society included an educational series on the American Revolution hosted by Henry Fonda, and a series on the works of Shakespeare. In 1975 Skinner was Executive Prodcer of produced Voyage of the Hokulea, a 90-minute special that included in the first successful voyage by the Hawaiian double-hulled canoe Hokulea from Hawaii to Tahiti utilizing only celestial navigation. Skinner was also Executve Producer of the 1984 National Geographic Special Among the Wild Chimpanzees about Jane Goodall.

Skinner won Emmys for The Great Whales, Planet Earth, Gorillas, and Rain Forest. Additionally, three works Executive Produced by Skinner received Peabody Awards: The Turned on Crisis in 1971, and the National Geographic Specials in 1980 and 1986. The National Geographic Special The Living Sands of Namib was awarded an Alfred I. duPont-Columbia University Awards in 1979.

In 1994, Skinner left QED Communications to produce commercial television projects, including the seven-hour series Pirate Tales for Turner Broadcasting. Skinner then joined Resolution Productions in Burlington, Vermont as vice president for Programming and Development creating and supervising shows for the Discovery and A&E Networks including Floating Palaces, California and the Dream Seekers and The Story of Money for A&E, and Battleship and The Secret World of Air Freight for the Discovery Channel.

Beginning in 2000, Skinner served as Managing Director at the Inland Seas Education Association, a non-profit organization in Suttons Bay, Michigan, that teaches school children about the science of the Great Lakes aboard tall ships.

In 1995 and 1996, Bob Chitester, then President and CEO of the Free To Choose Network, invited Skinner to serve as a production consultant for a major project produced by Free To Choose Network. Skinner joined Chitester as executive producer of the Milton Friedman television biography, “The Power of Choice" broadcast on PBS in 2007 after which Skinner joined the Free To Choose Network where he is Senior Executive Producer.

See also
Bob Chitester
Milton Friedman
Rose Friedman

References 

American television executives
University of Michigan alumni
Living people
Year of birth missing (living people)